The 1995 Columbia Lions football team was an American football team that represented Columbia University during the 1995 NCAA Division I-AA football season. Columbia finished fifth in the Ivy League. 

In their seventh season under head coach Ray Tellier, the Lions compiled a 3–6–1 record and were outscored 281 to 201. Mike Cavanaugh, Eric Keck and Rory Wilfork were the team captains.  

The Lions' 3–4 conference record placed fifth in the Ivy League standings. Columbia was outscored 200 to 142 by Ivy opponents. 

Columbia played its homes games at Lawrence A. Wien Stadium in Upper Manhattan, in New York City.

Schedule

References

Columbia
Columbia Lions football seasons
Columbia Lions football